Esther Phiri (born June 14, 1987) is a Former World Female Boxing Champion Zambian boxer. Esther was stripped of her title after her retirement. Esther is the first female Zambian boxer to get international recognition and accolades. She became world champion after defeating Belinda Laracuente.

Biography 
Phiri was still a teenager when, after the death of her father, she made a living selling fruit and vegetables. She became a mother at age 16. Boxing was a way for her to escape poverty and support her own child, and the children of her older sister, who had died. She was encouraged by Anthony Mwamba, a former boxer she met in 2003. Her first fight was in 2005. She won the GBU (Global Boxing Union) intercontinental belt for lightweights on June 30, 2007 at the expense of Radostina Valcheva and then retained it by beating Belinda Laracuente on 1 December 2007. The following year, she won the same belt but in the lower super-featherweight class.

Phiri became WIBA welterweight world champion after beating Duda Yankovich, May 29, 2010. Other important fights won by this boxer are those against Lely Luz Florez, in 2011, and Monalisa Sibanda, in 2012. She also invests in real estate.

Documentary film

The documentary film Between Rings, released in 2014, was created by her cousin Jessie Chisi. It tells Phiri's story, how she left her marriage to pursue a career in boxing, and remains torn between her own goals and her family and societal expectations.

Professional boxing record

References

External links

1987 births
Living people
Zambian women boxers
World boxing champions
Sportspeople from Lusaka
Bantamweight boxers